

Events

Pre-1600
 946 – Emperor Suzaku abdicates the throne in favor of his brother Murakami who becomes the 62nd emperor of Japan.
1204 – Baldwin IX, Count of Flanders is crowned as the first Emperor of the Latin Empire.
1364 – Hundred Years' War: Bertrand du Guesclin and a French army defeat the Anglo-Navarrese army of Charles the Bad at Cocherel.
1426 – Gov. Thado of Mohnyin becomes king of Ava.
1527 – The Florentines drive out the Medici for a second time and Florence re-establishes itself as a republic.
1532 – Sir Thomas More resigns as Lord Chancellor of England.
1568 – Mary, Queen of Scots, flees to England.
1584 – Santiago de Vera becomes sixth Governor-General of the Spanish colony of the Philippines.

1601–1900
1739 – The Battle of Vasai concludes as the Marathas defeat the Portuguese army.
1770 – The 14-year-old Marie Antoinette marries 15-year-old Louis-Auguste, who later becomes king of France.
1771 – The Battle of Alamance, a pre-American Revolutionary War battle between local militia and a group of rebels called The "Regulators", occurs in present-day Alamance County, North Carolina.
1811 – Peninsular War: The allies Spain, Portugal and United Kingdom fight an inconclusive battle against the French at the Albuera. It is, in proportion to the numbers involved, the bloodiest battle of the war.
1812 – Imperial Russia signs the Treaty of Bucharest, ending the Russo-Turkish War. The Ottoman Empire cedes Bessarabia to Russia.
1822 – Greek War of Independence: The Turks capture the Greek town of Souli.
1832 – Juan Godoy discovers the rich silver outcrops of Chañarcillo sparking the Chilean silver rush.
1834 – The Battle of Asseiceira is fought; it was the final and decisive engagement of the Liberal Wars in Portugal. 
1842 – The first major wagon train heading for the Pacific Northwest sets out on the Oregon Trail from Elm Grove, Missouri, with 100 pioneers.
1866 – The United States Congress establishes the nickel.
1868 – The United States Senate fails to convict President Andrew Johnson by one vote.
1874 – A flood on the Mill River in Massachusetts destroys much of four villages and kills 139 people.  
1877 – The 16 May 1877 crisis occurs in France, ending with the dissolution of the National Assembly 22 June and affirming the interpretation of the Constitution of 1875 as a parliamentary rather than presidential system. The elections held in October 1877 led to the defeat of the royalists as a formal political movement in France.
1888 – Nikola Tesla delivers a lecture describing the equipment which will allow efficient generation and use of alternating currents to transmit electric power over long distances.
1891 – The International Electrotechnical Exhibition opened in Frankfurt, Germany, featuring the world's first long-distance transmission of high-power, three-phase electric current (the most common form today).

1901–present
1916 – The United Kingdom of Great Britain and Ireland and the French Third Republic sign the secret wartime Sykes-Picot Agreement partitioning former Ottoman territories such as Iraq and Syria.
1918 – The Sedition Act of 1918 is passed by the U.S. Congress, making criticism of the government during wartime an imprisonable offense. It will be repealed less than two years later.
1919 – A naval Curtiss NC-4 aircraft commanded by Albert Cushing Read leaves Trepassey, Newfoundland, for Lisbon via the Azores on the first transatlantic flight.
1920 – In Rome, Pope Benedict XV canonizes Joan of Arc.
1925 – The first modern performance of Claudio Monteverdi's opera Il ritorno d'Ulisse in patria occurred in Paris.
1929 – In Hollywood, the first Academy Awards ceremony takes place. 
1943 – The Holocaust: The Warsaw Ghetto Uprising ends.
1943 – Operation Chastise is undertaken by RAF Bomber Command with specially equipped Avro Lancasters to destroy the Mohne, Sorpe, and Eder dams in the Ruhr valley.
1951 – The first regularly scheduled transatlantic flights begin between Idlewild Airport (now John F Kennedy International Airport) in New York City and Heathrow Airport in London, operated by El Al Israel Airlines.
1959 – The Triton Fountain in Valletta, Malta is turned on for the first time.
1960 – Theodore Maiman operates the first optical laser (a ruby laser), at Hughes Research Laboratories in Malibu, California.
1961 – Park Chung-hee leads a coup d'état to overthrow the Second Republic of South Korea.
1966 – The Chinese Communist Party issues the "May 16 Notice", marking the beginning of the Cultural Revolution.
1969 – Venera program: Venera 5, a Soviet space probe, lands on Venus.
1974 – Josip Broz Tito is elected president for life of Yugoslavia. 
1975 – Junko Tabei from Japan becomes the first woman to reach the summit of Mount Everest. 
1988 – A report by the Surgeon General of the United States C. Everett Koop states that the addictive properties of nicotine are similar to those of heroin and cocaine.
1991 – Queen Elizabeth II of the United Kingdom addresses a joint session of the United States Congress. She is the first British monarch to address the U.S. Congress.
1997 – Mobutu Sese Seko, the President of Zaire, flees the country.
2003 – In Morocco, 33 civilians are killed and more than 100 people are injured in the Casablanca terrorist attacks.
2005 – Kuwait permits women's suffrage in a 35–23 National Assembly vote.
2014 – Twelve people are killed in two explosions in the Gikomba market area of Nairobi, Kenya.

Births

Pre-1600
1418 – John II of Cyprus, King of Cyprus and Armenia and also titular King of Jerusalem from 1432 to 1458 (probable; d. 1458)
1455 – Wolfgang I of Oettingen, German count (d. 1522)
1542 – Anna Sibylle of Hanau-Lichtenberg, German noblewoman (d. 1580)

1601–1900
1606 – John Bulwer, British doctor (d. 1656)
1611 – Pope Innocent XI (d. 1689)
1641 – Dudley North, English economist and politician (d. 1691)
1710 – William Talbot, 1st Earl Talbot, English politician, Lord Steward of the Household (d. 1782)
1718 – Maria Gaetana Agnesi, Italian mathematician and philosopher (d. 1799)
1763 – Louis Nicolas Vauquelin, French pharmacist and chemist (d. 1829)
1788 – Friedrich Rückert, German poet and translator (d. 1866)
1801 – William H. Seward, American lawyer and politician, 24th United States Secretary of State (d. 1872)
1804 – Elizabeth Palmer Peabody, American educator who founded the first U.S. kindergarten (d. 1894)
1819 – Johann Voldemar Jannsen, Estonian journalist and poet (d. 1890)
1821 – Pafnuty Chebyshev, Russian mathematician and statistician (d. 1894)
1824 – Levi P. Morton, American banker and politician, 22nd United States Vice President (d. 1920)
  1824   – Edmund Kirby Smith, American general (d. 1893)
1827 – Pierre Cuypers, Dutch architect, designed the Amsterdam Centraal railway station and Rijksmuseum (d. 1921)
1831 – David Edward Hughes, Welsh-American physicist, co-invented the microphone (d. 1900)
1859 – Horace Hutchinson, English golfer (d. 1932)
1862 – Margaret Fountaine, English lepidopterist and diarist (d.1940)
1876 – Fred Conrad Koch, American biochemist and endocrinologist (d. 1948)
1879 – Pierre Gilliard, Swiss author and academic (d. 1962)
1882 – Simeon Price, American golfer (d. 1945)
1883 – Celâl Bayar, Turkish politician, 3rd President of Turkey (d. 1986)
1887 – Maria Lacerda de Moura, Brazilian teacher and anarcha-feminist (d. 1945)
1888 – Royal Rife, American microbiologist and instrument maker (d. 1971)
1890 – Edith Grace White, American ichthyologist (d. 1975)
1892 – Osgood Perkins, American actor (d. 1937)
1894 – Walter Yust, American journalist and writer (d. 1960)
1897 – Zvi Sliternik, Israeli entomologist and academic (d. 1994)
1898 – Tamara de Lempicka, Polish-American painter (d. 1980)
  1898   – Desanka Maksimović, Serbian poet and academic (d. 1993)
  1898   – Kenji Mizoguchi, Japanese director and screenwriter (d. 1956)

1901–present
1903 – Charles F. Brannock, American inventor and manufacturer (d. 1992)
1905 – Henry Fonda, American actor (d. 1982)
1906 – Ernie McCormick, Australian cricketer (d. 1991)
  1906   – Alfred Pellan, Canadian painter and educator (d. 1988)
  1906   – Arturo Uslar Pietri, Venezuelan lawyer, journalist, and author (d. 2001)
  1906   – Margret Rey, German author and illustrator (d. 1996)
1907 – Bob Tisdall, Irish hurdler (d. 2004)
1909 – Margaret Sullavan, American actress and singer (d. 1960)
  1909   – Luigi Villoresi, Italian race car driver (d. 1997)
1910 – Olga Bergholz, Russian poet and author (d. 1975)
  1910   – Higashifushimi Kunihide, Japanese monk and educator (d. 2014)
  1910   – Aleksandr Ivanovich Laktionov, Russian painter and educator (d. 1972)
1912 – Studs Terkel, American historian and author (d. 2008)
1913 – Gordon Chalk, Australian politician, 30th Premier of Queensland (d. 1991)
1913 – Woody Herman, American singer, saxophonist, and clarinet player (d. 1987)
1914 – Edward T. Hall, American anthropologist and author (d. 2009)
1915 – Mario Monicelli, Italian director and screenwriter (d. 2010)
1916 – Ephraim Katzir, Israeli biophysicist and politician, 4th President of Israel (d. 2009)
1917 – Ben Kuroki, American sergeant and pilot (d. 2015)
  1917   – James C. Murray, American lawyer and politician (d. 1999)
  1917   – Juan Rulfo, Mexican author and photographer (d. 1986)
1918 – Wilf Mannion, English footballer and manager (d. 2000)
1919 – Liberace, American pianist and entertainer (d. 1987)
  1919   – Ramon Margalef, Spanish ecologist and biologist (d. 2004)
1920 – Martine Carol, French actress (d. 1967)
1921 – Harry Carey, Jr., American actor, producer, and screenwriter (d. 2012)
1923 – Victoria Fromkin, American linguist and academic (d. 2000)
  1923   – Merton Miller, American economist and academic, Nobel Prize laureate (d. 2000)
  1923   – Peter Underwood, English parapsychologist and author (d. 2014)
1924 – Barbara Bachmann, American microbiologist (d. 1999)
  1924   – Dawda Jawara, 1st President of the Gambia (d. 2019)
1925 – Nancy Roman, American astronomer (d. 2018)
  1925   – Ola Vincent, Nigerian banker and economist  (d. 2012)
  1925   – Nílton Santos, Brazilian footballer (d. 2013)
1928 – Billy Martin, American baseball player and coach (d. 1989)
1929 – Betty Carter, American singer-songwriter (d. 1998)
  1929   – John Conyers, American lawyer and politician (d. 2019)
  1929   – Claude Morin, Canadian academic and politician
  1929   – Adrienne Rich, American poet, essayist, and feminist (d. 2012)
1930 – Friedrich Gulda, Austrian pianist and composer (d. 2000)
1931 – Vujadin Boškov, Serbian footballer, coach, and manager (d. 2014)
  1931   – Hana Brady, Jewish-Czech Holocaust victim (d.1944)
  1931   – K. Natwar Singh, Indian scholar and politician, Indian Minister of External Affairs
  1931   – Lowell P. Weicker, Jr., American soldier and politician, 85th Governor of Connecticut
1934 – Kenneth O. Morgan, Welsh historian and author
  1934   – Antony Walker, English general
1935 – Floyd Smith, Canadian ice hockey player and coach
1936 – Karl Lehmann, German cardinal (d. 2018)
1937 – Yvonne Craig, American ballet dancer and actress (d. 2015)
1938 – Stuart Bell, English lawyer and politician (d. 2012)
  1938   – Ivan Sutherland, American computer scientist and academic
  1938   – Marco Aurelio Denegri, Peruvian television host and sexologist (d. 2018)
1939 – Mario Segni, Italian professor and politician
1941 – Denis Hart, Australian archbishop
1942 – David Penry-Davey, English lawyer and judge (d. 2015)
1943 – Kay Andrews, Baroness Andrews, English politician
  1943   – Dan Coats, American politician and diplomat, 29th United States Ambassador to Germany
  1943   – Wieteke van Dort, Dutch actress, comedian, singer, writer and artist
1944 – Billy Cobham, Panamanian-American drummer, composer, and bandleader 
  1944   – Antal Nagy, Hungarian footballer
  1944   – Danny Trejo, American actor 
1946 – John Law, English sociologist and academic
  1946   – Robert Fripp, English guitarist, songwriter and producer
1947 – Cheryl Clarke, American writer
  1947   – Darrell Sweet, Scottish drummer (d. 1999)
  1947   – Roch Thériault, Canadian religious leader (d. 2011)
1948 – Jesper Christensen, Danish actor, director, and producer
  1948   – Judy Finnigan, English talk show host and author
  1948   – Enrico Fumia, Italian automobile and product designer
1948 – Jimmy Hood, Scottish engineer and politician (d. 2017)
  1948   – Emma Georgina Rothschild, English historian and academic
  1948   – Staf Van Roosbroeck, Belgian cyclist
1949 – Rick Reuschel, American baseball player
1950 – Georg Bednorz, German physicist and academic, Nobel Prize laureate
  1950   – Ray Condo, Canadian singer-songwriter and guitarist (d. 2004)
  1950   – Bruce Coville, American author
1951 – Christian Lacroix, French fashion designer
  1951   – Jonathan Richman, American singer-songwriter and guitarist 
  1951   – Janet Soskice, Canadian philosopher and theologian
1953 – Pierce Brosnan, Irish-American actor and producer
  1953   – Peter Onorati, American actor
  1953   – Richard Page, American singer-songwriter and bass player 
  1953   – Kitanoumi Toshimitsu, Japanese sumo wrestler, the 55th Yokozuna (d. 2015)
  1953   – David Maclean, Scottish politician
  1953   – Stephen Woolman, Lord Woolman, Scottish judge and academic
1954 – Dafydd Williams, Canadian physician and astronaut
1955 – Olga Korbut, Soviet gymnast
  1955   – Jack Morris, American baseball player and sportscaster
  1955   – Hazel O'Connor, English-born Irish singer-songwriter and actress
  1955   – Páidí Ó Sé, Irish footballer and manager (d. 2012)
  1955   – Debra Winger, American actress 
  1956   – Loretta Schrijver, Dutch television host, news anchor
1957 – Joan Benoit, American runner
  1957   – Benjamin Mancroft, 3rd Baron Mancroft, English politician
  1957   – Yuri Shevchuk, Russian singer-songwriter and guitarist 
  1957   – Anthony St John, 22nd Baron St John of Bletso, English lawyer and businessman
  1957   – Bob Suter, American ice hockey player and coach (d. 2014)
1959 – Mitch Webster, American baseball player
  1959   – Mare Winningham, American actress and singer-songwriter
1960 – Landon Deireragea, Nauruan politician, Nauruan Speaker of Parliament
  1960   – Bruce Norris, playwright
  1960   – S. Shanmuganathan, Sri Lankan commander and politician (d. 1998)
1961 – Kevin McDonald, Canadian actor and screenwriter
  1961   – Charles Wright, American wrestler
  1962   – Helga Radtke, German long jumper
1963 – Rachel Griffith, Anglo-American economist
  1963   – David Wilkinson, English theologian and academic
1964 – John Salley, American basketball player and actor
  1964   – Boyd Tinsley, American singer-songwriter and violinist 
  1964   – Milton Jones, English comedian, actor, and screenwriter
1965 – Krist Novoselic, American bass player, songwriter, author, and activist
  1965   – Tanel Tammet, Estonian computer scientist, engineer, and academic
1966 – Janet Jackson, American singer-songwriter actress
  1966   – Scott Reeves, American singer-songwriter and actor 
  1966   – Thurman Thomas, American football player
1967 – Doug Brocail, American baseball player and coach
  1967   – Susan Williams, Baroness Williams of Trafford, British politician
1968 – Ralph Tresvant, American singer and producer 
1969 – David Boreanaz, American actor
  1969   – Tucker Carlson, American journalist, co-founded The Daily Caller
  1969   – Steve Lewis, American sprinter
1970 – Gabriela Sabatini, Argentinian tennis player
  1970   – Danielle Spencer, Australian singer-songwriter and actress
1971 – Phil Clarke, English rugby league player and sportscaster
  1971   – Rachel Goswell, English singer-songwriter and guitarist 
1972 – Christian Califano, French rugby player
  1972   – Matthew Hart, New Zealand cricketer
1973 – Tori Spelling, American actress, reality television personality, and author
1974 – Laura Pausini, Italian singer-songwriter and producer
  1974   – Sonny Sandoval, American singer-songwriter and rapper
1975 – Tony Kakko, Finnish musician, composer, and vocalist
  1975   – Simon Whitfield, Canadian triathlete
1976 – Dirk Nannes, Australian-Dutch cricketer
1977 – Melanie Lynskey, New Zealand actress
  1977   – Emilíana Torrini, Icelandic singer-songwriter
1978 – Scott Nicholls, English motorcycle racer
  1978   – Lionel Scaloni, Argentinian footballer
1980 – Nuria Llagostera Vives, Spanish tennis player
1981 – Ricardo Costa, Portuguese footballer
1982 – Łukasz Kubot, Polish tennis player
1983 – Daniel Kerr, Australian footballer
  1983   – Kyle Wellwood, Canadian ice hockey player
1984 – Darío Cvitanich, Argentinian footballer
  1984   – Tomáš Fleischmann, Czech ice hockey player
  1984   – Jensen Lewis, American baseball player
  1984   – Rick Rypien, Canadian ice hockey player (d. 2011)
1985 – Anja Mittag, German footballer
  1985   – Rodrigo Peters Marques, Brazilian footballer
  1985   – Corey Perry, Canadian ice hockey player
1986 – Megan Fox, American actress
  1986   – Andy Keogh, Irish footballer
  1986   – Shamcey Supsup, Filipino model and architect
1987 – Tom Onslow-Cole, English race car driver
1988 – Jesús Castillo, Mexican footballer
  1988   – Martynas Gecevičius, Lithuanian basketball player
  1988   – Jaak Põldma, Estonian tennis player
1989 – Behati Prinsloo, Namibian model
1990 – Amanda Carreras, Gibraltarian tennis player
  1990   – Thomas Brodie-Sangster, English actor
  1990   – Darko Šarović, Serbian sprinter
  1990   – Omar Strong, American basketball player
1991 – Grigor Dimitrov, Bulgarian tennis player
  1991   – Joey Graceffa, American internet celebrity 
  1991   – Ashley Wagner, American figure skater
1992 – Jeff Skinner, Canadian ice hockey player
  1992   – Kirstin Maldonado, American singer and songwriter
1993 – Johannes Thingnes Bø, Norwegian biathlete
  1993   – Karol Mets, Estonian footballer
  1993   – IU, Korean singer-songwriter and actress
  1994 – Kathinka von Deichmann, Liechtenstein tennis player
1995 – Elizabeth Ralston, Australian footballer
1996 – Louisa Chirico, American tennis player
2000 – Luis Garcia, Dominican-American baseball player

Deaths

Pre-1600
 290 – Emperor Wu of Jin, Chinese emperor (b. 236)
 895 – Qian Kuan, Chinese nobleman
 934 – Meng Hanqiong, eunuch official of Later Tang
 995 – Fujiwara no Michitaka, Japanese nobleman (b. 953)
1182 – John Komnenos Vatatzes, Byzantine general (b. 1132)
1265 – Simon Stock, English-French saint (b. 1165)
1375 – Liu Bowen, Chinese military strategist, officer, statesman and poet (b. 1311)
1412 – Gian Maria Visconti, Duke of Milan (b. 1388)
1561 – Jan Tarnowski, Polish noble and statesman (b. 1488)

1601–1900
1620 – William Adams, English sailor and navigator (b. 1564)
1657 – Andrew Bobola, Polish missionary and martyr (b. 1591)
1667 – Thomas Wriothesley, 4th Earl of Southampton, English politician, Lord High Treasurer (b. 1607)
1669 – Pietro da Cortona, Italian painter and architect, designed the Santi Luca e Martina (b. 1596)
1691 – Jacob Leisler, German-American politician, 8th Colonial Governor of New York (b. 1640)
1696 – Mariana of Austria, Queen consort of Spain (b. 1634)
1703 – Charles Perrault, French author and academic (b. 1628)
1778 – Robert Darcy, 4th Earl of Holderness, English politician, Secretary of State for the Southern Department (b. 1718)
1790 – Philip Yorke, 2nd Earl of Hardwicke, English politician, Lord Lieutenant of Cambridgeshire (b. 1720)
1818 – Matthew Lewis, English author and playwright (b. 1775)
1823 – Grace Elliott, Scottish courtesan and spy (b. c.1754)
1830 – Joseph Fourier, French mathematician and physicist (b. 1768)
1861 – John Stevens Henslow, British priest, geologist and doctoral advisor to Charles Darwin (b. 1796)
1862 – Edward Gibbon Wakefield, English politician (b. 1796)
1882 – Reuben Chapman, American lawyer and politician, 13th Governor of Alabama (b. 1799)
1890 – Mihkel Veske, Estonian poet, linguist and theologist (b. 1843)
1891 – Ion C. Brătianu, Romanian politician, 14th Prime Minister of Romania (b. 1821)

1901–present
1910 – Henri-Edmond Cross, French Neo-Impressionist painter (b. 1856)
1913 – Louis Perrier, Swiss architect and politician (b. 1849)
1920 – Levi P. Morton, American politician, 22nd United States Vice President (b. 1824)
1926 – Mehmed VI, the 36th and last Sultan of the Ottoman Empire (b. 1861)
1936 – Leonidas Paraskevopoulos, Greek general and politician (b. 1860)
1938 – Joseph Strauss, American engineer, co designed The Golden Gate Bridge (b. 1870)
1943 – Alfred Hoche, German psychiatrist and academic (b. 1865)
1944 – George Ade, American journalist, author, and playwright (b. 1866)
  1944   – Filip Mișea, Aromanian activist, physician and politician (b. 1873)
1946 – Bruno Tesch, German chemist and businessman (b. 1890)
1947 – Frederick Gowland Hopkins, English biochemist and academic, Nobel Prize laureate (b. 1861)
  1947   – Zhang Lingfu, Chinese general (b. 1903)
1953 – Django Reinhardt, Belgian guitarist and composer  (b. 1910)
1954 – Clemens Krauss, Austrian conductor and manager (b. 1893)
1955 – James Agee, American novelist, screenwriter, and critic(b. 1909)
  1955   – Manny Ayulo, American race car driver (b. 1921)
1956 – H. B. Reese, American candy-maker and businessman, created Reese's Peanut Butter Cups  (b. 1876)
1957 – Eliot Ness, American federal agent (b. 1903)
1961 – George A. Malcolm, American lawyer and jurist (b. 1881)
1977 – Modibo Keïta, Malian politician, 1st President of Mali (b. 1915)
1979 – A. Philip Randolph, American union leader and activist (b. 1889)
1981 – Ernie Freeman, American pianist, composer, and bandleader (b. 1922)
  1981   – Willy Hartner, German physician and academic (b. 1905)
1984 – Andy Kaufman, American actor, comedian, and screenwriter (b. 1949)
  1984   – Irwin Shaw, American playwright, screenwriter, novelist, and short story writer (b. 1913)
1985 – Margaret Hamilton, American actress (b. 1902)
1989 – Leila Kasra, Iranian poet and songwriter (b. 1939)
1990 – Sammy Davis Jr., American singer, dancer, and actor (b. 1925)
  1990   – Jim Henson, American puppeteer, director, producer, and screenwriter, created The Muppets (b. 1936)
1993 – Marv Johnson, American singer-songwriter and pianist (b. 1938)
1994 – Alain Cuny, French actor (b. 1908)
1996 – Jeremy Michael Boorda, American admiral (b. 1939)
1997 – Elbridge Durbrow, American diplomat (b. 1903)
2002 – Alec Campbell, Australian soldier (b. 1899)
2003 – Mark McCormack, American lawyer and sports agent, founded IMG (b. 1930)
2005 – Andrew Goodpaster, American general (b. 1915)
2008 – Robert Mondavi, American winemaker, co-founded the Opus One Winery (b. 1913)
2010 – Ronnie James Dio, American singer-songwriter and producer (b. 1942)
  2010   – Hank Jones, American pianist, composer, and bandleader (b. 1918)
2011 – Ralph Barker, English author (b. 1917) 
  2011   – Bob Davis, Australian footballer and coach (b. 1928)
  2011   – Edward Hardwicke, English actor (b. 1932)
  2011   – Kiyoshi Kodama, Japanese actor (b. 1934)
2012 – Patricia Aakhus, American author and academic (b. 1952)
  2012   – James Abdnor, American soldier and politician (b. 1923)
  2012   – Chuck Brown, American singer-songwriter, guitarist, and producer (b. 1936)
  2012   – Ernie Chan, Filipino-American illustrator (b. 1940)
  2012   – Kevin Hickey, American baseball player (b. 1956)
2013 – Angelo Errichetti, American politician (b. 1928)
  2013   – Bryan Illerbrun, Canadian football player (b. 1957)
  2013   – Frankie Librán, Puerto Rican-American baseball player (b. 1948)
  2013   – Heinrich Rohrer, Swiss physicist and academic, Nobel Prize laureate (b. 1933)
  2013   – Paul Shane, British actor and comedian (b. 1940)
  2013   – Dick Trickle, American race car driver (b. 1941)
  2013   – Bernard Waber, American author and illustrator (b. 1921)
2014 – Chris Duckworth, Zimbabwean-South African cricketer (b. 1933)
  2014   – Vito Favero, Italian cyclist (b. 1932)
  2014   – Bud Hollowell, American baseball player and manager (b. 1943)
  2014   – Clyde Snow, American anthropologist and author (b. 1928)
2015 – Prashant Bhargava, American director and producer (b. 1973)
  2015   – Moshe Levinger, Israeli rabbi and author (b. 1935)
  2015   – Flora MacNeil, Scottish Gaelic singer (b. 1928)
2019 – Piet Blauw, Dutch politician (b. 1937)
  2019   – Bob Hawke, Australian politician, 23rd Prime Minister of Australia (b. 1929)
  2019   – I. M. Pei, Chinese-American architect (b. 1917) 
2021 – Bruno Covas, Brazilian lawyer, politician (b. 1980)

Holidays and observances
 Christian feast day:
 Aaron (Coptic Church)
 Abda and Abdjesus, and companions:
 Abdas of Susa
 Andrew Bobola
 Brendan the Navigator (Roman Catholic Church, Anglican Communion, Eastern Orthodox Church)
 Caroline Chisholm (Church of England)
 Gemma Galgani (Passionists Calendar)
 Germerius
 Honoratus of Amiens
 John of Nepomuk
 Margaret of Cortona
 Peregrine of Auxerre
 Simon Stock
 Ubald (see Saint Ubaldo Day)
 May 16 (Eastern Orthodox liturgics)
 Martyrs of Sudan (Episcopal Church (USA))
 Mass Graves Day (Iraq)
 National Day, declared by Salva Kiir Mayardit (South Sudan)
 Teachers' Day (Malaysia)

References

External links

 BBC: On This Day
 
 Historical Events on May 16

Days of the year
May